Charles Herbert Flowers High School is a comprehensive science and technology magnet school located in unincorporated Prince George's County, Maryland, United States, adjacent to the Springdale census-designated place and with a Springdale postal address. It is part of the Prince George's County School System. Its principal is Dr. Gorman Brown.

The school serves: most of the City of Glenarden, all of Lake Arbor CDP and Springdale CDP, portions of Landover CDP and Summerfield CDP, and most of the 2010-defined Mitchellville and Woodmore CDPs.

Flowers High School's motto is "Mecca of Excellence." The school's Alma Mater, "A Mecca of Excellence," was written by R&B singer and 2004 graduate Patrice Jones and principal Helena Jones.

History
The school opened its doors in August 2000, for only 9th and 10th grade students. At that time, it was the first new high school in 26 years constructed in the Prince George's County Public School system. It had a cost of $30 million. 1,000 were expected at its opening.

The provisional name was Ardmore High School until the final name was decided. The Prince George's County Board of Education considered several names for the school, but ultimately settled on long-time Glenarden resident Charles Herbert Flowers, a well-known trainer of the Tuskegee Airmen. In doing so, the school board waived its guideline for naming schools posthumously. Flowers appeared to celebrate the school's opening.

As the school was to open, residents in the wealthier areas of Lake Arbor and Mitchellville and the lower income Landover were competing over who would be served by the school; some wealthier African-Americans were reluctant to let their children go to school with poor children. In April 2000 the school board chose not to include Palmer Park students in the Flowers attendance zone, so they were instead assigned to DuVal High School. If Palmer Park was included, the estimate calculated was an additional 115 students, which would have made the occupancy 100.6%.

Campus
The building has one gymnasium, an auditorium with 750 seats, and 18 laboratories for science classes.
In 2018 the school began using a classroom as a school supply area for new teachers in the district. Experienced teachers supply the "treasure room" with excess school supplies.

School uniforms
Initially, students of Charles Herbert Flowers were not required to wear uniforms, although there was a dress code that students had to adhere to. In the fall of 2005, following a school-wide survey of parents and students, Flowers students were required to wear a school uniform that consisted of grey slacks or grey pleated skirts, white polo or oxford shirts consisting of the school logo, a hunter green blazer or v-neck sweater vest, and v-neck long-sleeve sweater, all bearing the school logo, as well as a black belt and black shoes.

The class of 2006 was the first senior class required to wear uniforms. The school uniform policy remains, but is no longer as strict. Students are no longer are required to purchase their uniforms from the school, making the uniforms more affordable. Today, the uniforms for all students are black khakis with a forest green polo shirt, with any color shoes. 

Beginning in the 2011–2012 school year, students in the Science and Technology Program, who have internships during the day, wear an all-black uniform. This uniform consists of a black top with the new Science and Technology logo and the word "INTERN" underneath, and black bottoms.

Academics
Charles Herbert Flowers High School is part of the Prince George's County Science and Technology program. This program also includes Eleanor Roosevelt High School and Oxon Hill High School.

As of 2010 80% of its 12th grade students passed Maryland state achievement tests, and Flowers had an 82% graduation rate. In the previous year it met every adequate yearly progress (AYP) target set by the federal government.

Previously the school only allowed students already making a 3.0 grade point average and with permission from teachers to sign up for Advanced Placement (AP) courses. By that period most U.S. schools, which had previously restricted AP enrollment to high-achieving students, began to let all students sign up; in 2010 the school still restricted AP classes even though PGCPS policy stated that they must be open to all students. After Jay Mathews of The Washington Post inquired on the matter, principal Helena Nobles-Jones stated that the restriction policy had been dropped.

Notable alumni 

 Rico Nasty, rapper and singer
 Jazz Lewis, member of the Maryland House of Delegates
 Xanman, rapper and singer
 Redveil, rapper and singer

School organizations

 Student Government Association
 Future Business Leaders of America
National Art Honor Society
Science National Honor Society
 National Chinese Honor Society
 Chinese Game Club
 National Honor Society
 Student Humanitarian Organization
 Air Force Junior Reserve Officer Training Corps
 Jaguar Players Drama Club
 Science and Technology Academic Reformers (STAR)
 It's Academic
 Pom & Dance Team
 Mock Trials Defence Team
 Environmental Science Club
 National Society of Black Engineers
 College Summit
 African Students' Association
 Young People for God Christian Club
 Muslim Students' Association
 Math Honor Society
 Mathematic Engineering and Science Achievement
 Spanish Honor Society
 Scholarship Club
 Poetry Club
 Community Day
 Flowers Kouture
 Inklings: Young Writers Club
 ProStart Culinary Arts Program
 Jaguar Debate Team

References

External links
 Charles Herbert Flowers High School
 

NCSSS schools
Public high schools in Maryland
Magnet schools in Maryland
Schools in Prince George's County, Maryland
Educational institutions established in 2000
2000 establishments in Maryland